Teufen is a municipality in the canton of Appenzell Ausserrhoden in Switzerland.

History

Teufen (Tiuffen) was first mentioned in 1272. By 1300 the place consisted of only five farms. In 1525 the assembly ruled that each parish could decide whether or not to remain Catholic. This led to the division of Appenzell in 1597. While the town of Teufen adopted the new protestant faith, Wonnenstein Friary remained Roman Catholic. In 1870 the Friary grounds were declared an exclave of Appenzell Innerrhoden.

In 1841 Teufen offered their new school building as a present to attract the government of the canton. The assembly refused the present.

Weaving was important in Teufen. Around 1820 a new loom was invented in Teufen, allowing embroidery in one go. This led to a boom in embroidery, particularly between 1880 and 1890.

Geography
Of this area, 55.4% is used for agricultural purposes, while 29.8% is forested. Of the rest of the land, 14% is settled (buildings or roads) and the remainder (0.8%) is non-productive (rivers, glaciers or mountains).

Wonnenstein Friary in Teufen is an exclave of Appenzell Innerrhoden.

Demographics
Teufen has a population of 5,766, of which about 10.0% are foreign nationals.  Over the last 10 years the population has grown at a rate of 6.8%.  Most of the population speaks German  (93.4%), with Italian being second most common ( 1.3%) and Spanish being third ( 0.9%).

, the gender distribution of the population was 48.5% male and 51.5% female.  The age distribution, in Teufen is; 409 people or 7.4% of the population are between 0–6 years old.  586 people or 10.6% are 6-15, and 248 people or 4.5% are 16–19.  Of the adult population, 247 people or 4.5% of the population are between 20–24 years old.  1,544 people or 27.9% are 25–44, and 1,430 people or 25.8% are 45–64.  The senior population distribution is 751 people or 13.6% of the population are between 65–79 years old, and  320 people or 5.8% are over 80.

In the 2007 federal election the FDP received 72.9% of the vote.

In Teufen about 79.7% of the population (between age 25-64) have completed either non-mandatory upper secondary education or additional higher education (either university or a Fachhochschule).

Teufen has an unemployment rate of 1.27%.  , there were 136 people employed in the primary economic sector and about 66 businesses involved in this sector.  657 people are employed in the secondary sector and there are 79 businesses in this sector.  1,463 people are employed in the tertiary sector, with 266 businesses in this sector.

The historical population is given in the following table:

Heritage sites of national significance
The Gmündertobel Bridge (shared with Stein, Appenzell), and the Wattbach Bridge (shared with Stein and St. Gallen) are listed as heritage sites of national significance.

Weather
Teufen has an average of 154.2 days of rain per year and on average receives  of precipitation. During this month there is precipitation for an average of 15.1 days. The month with the most days of precipitation is May, with an average of 15.2, but with only  of precipitation.

Tritium
Teufen is home to RC Tritec, a company that provides Tritium and other radioactive isotopes to industry.  Until 2008 they provided luminous Tritium compounds for the Swiss watch industry, but they have replaced radioactive Tritium with non-radioactive Super-LumiNova.  Tritium emissions are tested every week and monitored by the Federal Government.  In 2010 the waste water radiation levels reached a high of 16 GBq, which is still below the 20 GBq limit, due to construction activities.  The 2011 waste water readings are only 2GBq.

References

External links

 Official Page (German)
 Official Municipal Newspaper (German)
 Bilder von Teufen (German)

Municipalities of Appenzell Ausserrhoden
Cultural property of national significance in Appenzell Ausserrhoden